Diego Álvarez (c. 1555 – 1632) was a Spanish theologian who opposed Molinism. He was archbishop of Trani from 1607 to his death.

Life
Diego Álvarez was born at Medina de Rioseco, Old Castile, about 1555. He entered the Dominican Order in his native city, and taught theology for twenty years in the Spanish cities of Burgos, Trianos, Plasencia, and Valladolid, and for ten years (1596-1606) at the Dominican convent of Santa Maria sopra Minerva, in Rome. From 1603 to 1606 he was elected Regent of the Collegium Divi Thomae of the Dominicans in Rome.

Shortly after his arrival in Rome (7 November 1596) he presented to Pope Clement VIII a memorial requesting him to examine the work Concordia liberi Arbitrii, by Luis de Molina, S.J., which, upon its publication in 1588, had given rise to bitter controversy, known as Molinism, on the extent of knowledge of God in the Divine providence. Before the Congregation (Congregatio de Auxiliis), appointed by the Pope to settle the dispute, he defended the Thomistic doctrines of grace, predestination, etc., alone for three years, and, thereafter, conjointly with his confrere Tomas de Lemos, to whom he gave the first place, until the suspension of the Congregation (1606).

He was appointed on 19 March 1607, by Pope Paul V, to the Archbishopric of Trani. The episcopal consecration followed on 1 April in the Basilica of Santa Maria sopra Minerva by the hands of Girolamo Bernerio. He passed the remainder of his life in Trani where he died on 10 May 1632. He was buried in that cathedral.

Works

Besides a commentary on Isaiah, and a manual for preachers, he published: De auxiliis divinæ gratiæ et humani arbitrii viribus et libertate, ac legitimâ ejus cum efficaciâ eorumdem auxiliorum concordiâ libri XII (Rome, 1610; Lyons, 1620; Douai, 1635); Responsionum ad objectiones adversus concordiam liberi arbitrii cum divinâ, præscientiâ, providentiâ, et prædestinatione, atque cum efficaciâ prævenientis gratiæ, prout a S. Thomâ et Thomistis defenditur et explicatur, Libri IV (Trani, 1622; Lyons, 1622); De origine Pelagianæ hæresis et ejus progressu et damnatione per plures summos pontifices et concilia factâ Historia ex annalibus Card. Baronii et aliis probatis auctoribus collecta (Trani, 1629); Responsionum liber ultimus hoc titulo: Opus præclarum nunquam hâctenus editum, in quo argumentis validissimis concordia liberi arbitrii cum divinâ præscientiâ, prædestinatione, et efficaciâ gratiæ prævenientis ad mentem S. Thomæ et omnium defenditur et explicatur (Douai, 1635); Operis de auxiliis divinæ gratiæ et humani arbitrii viribus et libertate, ac legitimâ ejus cum efficaciæ eorumdem auxiliorum concordiâ summa, in IV libros distincta (Lyons, 1620; Cologne, 1621; Trani, 1625); De incarnatione divini verbi disputationes LXXX; in quibus explicantur et defenduntur, quæ in tertiâ parte summæ theologicæ docet S. Thomas a Q. 1 ad 24 (Lyons, 1614; Rome, 1615; Cologne, 1622); Disputationes theologicæ in primam secundæ S. Thomæ, in quibus præcipua omina quæ adversus doctrinam ejusdem et communem Thomistarum a diversis auctoribus impugnantur, juxta legitimum sensum præceptoris angelici explicantur et defenduntur (Trani, 1617; Cologne, 1621).

References 

1550s births
1632 deaths
Spanish Dominicans
Dominican bishops
Dominican theologians
16th-century Spanish Roman Catholic theologians
Thomists
17th-century Italian Roman Catholic archbishops
Archbishops of Trani
Date of birth unknown
17th-century Spanish Roman Catholic theologians